John Yang is the name of:

John Yang (photographer) (1933-2009), architect and photographer
John Yang (journalist) (born 1958), journalist and television news correspondent
John Baptist Yang Xiaoting (born 1964), Chinese Roman Catholic bishop
Jack Yang, Harvard scientist

See also 
 Yang (surname)
 Andrew Yang, mistakenly referred to as "John Yang" by MSNBC during his presidential campaign